Slovenia participated in the Eurovision Song Contest 2009 with the song "Love Symphony" written by Andrej Babić and Aleksandar Valenčić. The song was performed by Quartissimo feat. Martina. Slovenian broadcaster Radiotelevizija Slovenija (RTV Slovenija) organised the national final EMA 2009 in order to select the Slovenian entry for the 2009 contest in Moscow, Russia. The national final consisted of a semi-final and a final where "Love Symphony" performed by Quartissimo feat. Martina was eventually selected as the winner following the combination of votes from a three-member jury panel and a public vote.

Slovenia was drawn to compete in the second semi-final of the Eurovision Song Contest which took place on 14 May 2009. Performing during the show in position 10, "Love Symphony" was not announced among the top 10 entries of the second semi-final and therefore did not qualify to compete in the final. It was later revealed that Slovenia placed sixteenth out of the 19 participating countries in the semi-final with 14 points.

Background 

Slovenia's highest placing in the contest, to this point, has been seventh place, which the nation achieved on two occasions: in 1995 with the song "Prisluhni mi" performed by Darja Švajger and in 2001 with the song "Energy" performed by Nuša Derenda. The country's only other top ten result was achieved in 1997 when Tanja Ribič performing "Zbudi se" placed tenth. Since the introduction of semi-finals to the format of the contest in 2004, Slovenia had thus far only managed to qualify to the final on one occasion. In 2008, "Vrag naj vzame" performed by Rebeka Dremelj failed to qualify to the final.

The Slovenian national broadcaster, Radiotelevizija Slovenija (RTV Slovenija), broadcasts the event within Slovenia and organises the selection process for the nation's entry. RTV Slovenija confirmed Slovenia's participation in the 2009 Eurovision Song Contest on 14 September 2008. The Slovenian entry for the Eurovision Song Contest has traditionally been selected through a national final entitled Evrovizijska Melodija (EMA), which has been produced with variable formats. For 2009, the broadcaster opted to organise EMA 2009 to select the Slovenian entry.

Before Eurovision

EMA 2009 

EMA 2009 was the 14th edition of the Slovenian national final format Evrovizijska Melodija (EMA). The competition was used by RTV Slovenija to select Slovenia's entry for the Eurovision Song Contest 2009. The 2009 edition of EMA took place at the RTV Slovenija Studio 1 in Ljubljana, hosted by Peter Poles and Maja Martina Merljak and consisted of two shows: a semi-final and a final. The competition was broadcast on TV SLO1 and online via the broadcaster's website rtvslo.si.

Format 
A total of twenty-one songs competed in two televised shows consisting of a semi-final on 31 January 2009 and a final on 1 February 2009. Fourteen of the songs were selected from open submissions and competed in the semi-final with the 50/50 combination of points from an expert jury and public televoting selecting eight finalists out of the fourteen songs to proceed to the final. In the final, the eight qualifying songs in the semi-final alongside an additional six pre-qualified songs written by composers directly invited by RTV Slovenija for the competition competed and the winner was selected by the 50/50 combination of points from an expert jury and public televoting.

Competing entries 
Artists and composers were able to submit their entries to the broadcaster between 11 October 2008 and 28 November 2008. 113 entries were received by the broadcaster during the submission period. An expert committee consisting of Darja Švajger (singer, vocal coach and 1995 and 1999 Slovenian Eurovision entrant), Jernej Vene (music editor for Radia Slovenija) and Mojca Menart (Head of the publishing business of ZKP RTV SLO) selected fourteen artists and songs for the semi-final of the competition from the received submissions, while the six songs pre-qualifying songs for the final of the competition were written by composers directly invited by RTV Slovenija based on their success on EMA in recent years and their performance in the Slovenian charts: Aleš Klinar, Boštjan Grabnar, Jan Plestenjak, Jože Potrebuješ, Matjaž Vlašič and Omar Naber. The composers also selected the performer for their entry. The competing artists were announced on 3 December 2008. Among the competing artists was former Slovenian Eurovision contestant Karmen Stavec who represented Slovenia in 2003.

Semi-final
The semi-final of EMA 2009 took place on 31 January 2009. In addition to the performances of the competing entries, Darja Švajger and 2007 Slovenian Eurovision entrant Alenka Gotar performed as guests. The combination of points from a three-member jury panel and a public vote selected eight entries to proceed to the final. The jury consisted of Urška Čop (music editor for Radio Maribor), Andrea Zuppini (Italian composer and arranger) and Anja Rogljić (Head of the Serbian delegation at the Eurovision Song Contest).

Final
The final of EMA 2009 took place on 1 February 2009. The eight entries that qualified from the semi-final alongside the six pre-qualified entries competed. In addition to the performances of the competing entries, 2008 Slovenian Eurovision entrant Rebeka Dremelj, 2008 Eurovision winner Dima Bilan, Natalija Verboten and Helena Blagne performed as guests. The combination of points from a three-member jury panel and a public vote selected "Love Symphony" performed by Quartissimo feat. Martina Majerle as the winner. The jury consisted of Urška Čop (music editor for Radio Maribor), Andrea Zuppini (Italian composer and arranger) and Anja Rogljić (Head of the Serbian delegation at the Eurovision Song Contest).

Promotion 
Quartissimo and Martina made several appearances across Europe to specifically promote "Love Symphony" as the Slovenian Eurovision entry. On 1 March, Quartissimo and Martina appeared during the Bosnian song presentation show BH Eurosong 2009 where they performed the Slovene version of "Love Symphony", entitled "Simfonija". On 7 March, Quartissimo and Martina performed during the semi-final of the Serbian Eurovision national final Beovizija 2009. On 18 April, Quartissimo and Martina performed during the Eurovision Promo Concert event which was held at the Amsterdam Marcanti venue in Amsterdam, Netherlands and hosted by Marcha and Maggie MacNeal.

At Eurovision 
According to Eurovision rules, all nations with the exceptions of the host country and the "Big Four" (France, Germany, Spain and the United Kingdom) are required to qualify from one of two semi-finals in order to compete for the final; the top nine songs from each semi-final as determined by televoting progress to the final, and a tenth was determined by back-up juries. The European Broadcasting Union (EBU) split up the competing countries into six different pots based on voting patterns from previous contests, with countries with favourable voting histories put into the same pot. On 30 January 2009, a special allocation draw was held which placed each country into one of the two semi-finals. Slovenia was placed into the second semi-final, to be held on 14 May 2009. The running order for the semi-finals was decided through another draw on 16 March 2009 and Slovenia was set to perform in position 10, following the entry from Denmark and before the entry from Hungary.

In Slovenia, the semi-finals and the final were televised on RTV Slovenija with commentary by Andrej Hofer. The Slovenian spokesperson, who announced the Slovenian votes during the final, was Peter Poles.

Semi-final 
Quartissimo and Martina took in technical rehearsals on 6 and 9 May, followed by dress rehearsals on 13 and 14 May. The Slovenian performance began with Quartissimo and Martina behind white decorated canvases showing their shades followed by the members of Quartissimo tearing down their canvases from the frames, appearing on the stage in black suits playing string instruments. Martina, who wore a long white dress, remained behind the white canvas and performed the first verse of the song in Slovene. In the second part of the performance, Martina tore down her canvas and stepped forward to the stage. The LED screens displayed images of musical notes and strings of a violin on a black background. The creative director for the Slovenian performance was Miha Alujevič. The backing vocalist that joined Quartissimo and Martina on stage was Sandra Feketija.

At the end of the show, Slovenia was not announced among the top 10 entries in the second semi-final and therefore failed to qualify to compete in the final. It was later revealed that Slovenia placed sixteenth in the semi-final, receiving a total of 14 points.

Voting 
The voting system for 2009 involved each country awarding points from 1-8, 10 and 12, with the points in the final being decided by a combination of 50% national jury and 50% televoting. Each nation's jury consisted of five music industry professionals who are citizens of the country they represent. This jury judged each entry based on: vocal capacity; the stage performance; the song's composition and originality; and the overall impression by the act. In addition, no member of a national jury was permitted to be related in any way to any of the competing acts in such a way that they cannot vote impartially and independently.

Below is a breakdown of points awarded to Slovenia and awarded by Slovenia in the second semi-final and grand final of the contest. The nation awarded its 12 points to Serbia in the semi-final and to Norway in the final of the contest.

Points awarded to Slovenia

Points awarded by Slovenia

Detailed voting results 
The following members comprised the Slovene jury:

 Anžej Dežansinger, represented Slovenia in the 2006 contest
 Nuša Derendasinger, represented Slovenia in the 2001 contest
 Matjaž Vlašičcomposer of the 1998, 2005 and 2006 Slovene contest entries
 Aida Kurtovićproducer
 Dušan Hrendirector

References 

2009
Countries in the Eurovision Song Contest 2009
Eurovision